The Lion Of Yanina is a novel written by  Stojan Hristov. The full name of the novel is: The Lion Of Yanina a narrative based on the life of Ali Pasha, tyrant of Greece and Albania.

External links
 (Book Review)

References

Macedonian literature
1941 novels
Ali Pasha of Ioannina